Ischke Senekal (born 8 January 1993) is a South African discus thrower.

She won the silver medal at the 2015 African Games (discus), finished fifth at the 2015 African Games (shot put), twelfth at the 2015 Summer Universiade (discus), fifth at the 2016 African Championships (both discus and (shot put) and tenth at the 2017 Summer Universiade (discus).

She also competed at the 2012 World Junior Championships (discus) and the 2017 Summer Universiade (shot put) without reaching the final.

Her personal best throw is 56.86 metres, achieved in April 2016 in Stellenbosch. She has 17.56 metres in the shot put, achieved in April 2018 in Sasolburg.

International competitions

References 

1993 births
Living people
South African female discus throwers
South African female shot putters
African Games silver medalists for South Africa
African Games medalists in athletics (track and field)
Athletes (track and field) at the 2015 African Games
Athletes (track and field) at the 2019 African Games
White South African people
African Championships in Athletics winners
South African Athletics Championships winners
20th-century South African women
21st-century South African women